Mburahati is an administrative ward in the Ubungo District  of the Dar es Salaam Region of Tanzania. In 2016 the Tanzania National Bureau of Statistics report there were 42,730 people in the ward, from 34,123 in 2012.

References

Kinondoni District
Wards of Dar es Salaam Region